Pērkons is a Latvian rock band formed in the 1980s. The group's lineup is Juris Kulakovs (keyboard, compositions), Juris Sējāns (bass, vocals), Leons Sējāns (lead guitar), Ieva Akurātere (vocals), Raimonds Bartaševics (vocals), and Ikars Ruņģis (drums).

At first, Pērkons played two completely different kinds of music – instrumental classical music, and rock'n'roll bordering on hard rock. The band then became better known for the latter. Their songs became the folklore of the youth, speaking about things nobody else dared to speak about. In 1983, the band was banned by the Soviet power in 1983.however they renamed and continued to play as the Ensemble of the Soviet Latvia Collective Farm,. In 1985, after a concert in Ogre, a group of teenagers demolished two train compartments. After this, the group was banned again immediately, even though it had nothing to do with the incident. The concert, demolished train, and court trials were documented by Juris Podnieks in the film, Is It Easy to Be Young?

After a few more years, in 1987, they arrived to the song festival Liepājas dzintars as the ensemble of the fishermen's kolkhoz "Selga".

The texts of their music are at least as rebellious as the music itself, mostly written by Māris Melgalvs, one of the best-known examples is Balāde par gulbi. The group has also performed Songs of Fredman by the Swedish 18th century song-poet Carl Michael Bellman.

References

External links
Lyrics 

Latvian rock music groups
Soviet rock music groups